This is a list of Italian inventors:

A
 Giovanni Battista Amici

B
 Flavio Baracchini
 Eugenio Barsanti
 Robert Ludvigovich Bartini
 Gianni Bettini
 Lucio Bini
Augusto Bissiri
 Claudio Bordignon
 Enea Bossi, Sr.
 Giovanni Branca
 Luigi Valentino Brugnatelli
 Tito Livio Burattini

C
 Temistocle Calzecchi-Onesti
 Tullio Campagnolo
 Secondo Campini
 Mario Capecchi
 Arturo Caprotti
 Gerolamo Cardano
 Antonio Benedetto Carpano
 Giovanni Caselli
 Ugo Cerletti
 Leonardo Chiariglione
 Alberto Ciaramella
 Giuseppe Cipriani
 Francesco Cirio
 Bartolomeo Cristofori
 Alessandro Cruto

D
 Luigi Dadda
 Salvino D'Armate
 Corradino D'Ascanio
 Leonardo da Vinci
 Giuseppe Donati

E

F
 Fabio Perini
 Gabriele Falloppio
 Federico Faggin
 Enrico Fermi
 Salvatore Ferragamo
 Galileo Ferraris
 Pietro Ferrero
 Carlo Forlanini
 Enrico Forlanini

G
 Galileo Galilei
 Luigi Galvani
 Gasparo da Salò
 Giovanni Francesco Gemelli Careri
 Flavio Gioja
 Giuseppe di Giugno
 Guido of Arezzo

J
 Candido Jacuzzi

L
 Ruggero Lenci
 Leonardo da Vinci
 Domingo Liotta
 Cesare Lombroso
 Vincenzo Lunardi
 Giovanni Luppis

M
 Amatino Manucci
 Innocenzo Manzetti
 Guglielmo Marconi
 Felice Matteucci
 Antonio Meucci
 Guido Monaco
 Maria Montessori
 Angelo Moriondo

N
 Giulio Natta

P
 Antonio Pacinotti
Luigi Palmieri
 Enzo Paoletti
 Pier Giorgio Perotto
 Ignazio Porro
 Giambattista della Porta
 Francesco Procopio dei Coltelli

R
 Giuseppe Ravizza

S
 Sanctorius
 Raimondo di Sangro
 Antonio Sant'Elia
 Ascanio Sobrero
 Nazareno Strampelli

T
 Gasparo Tagliacozzi
 Teseo Tesei
  Luigi Torchi
 Evangelista Torricelli
 Pellegrino Turri
 Juanelo Turriano

V
 Alessandro Volta
 Andrew Viterbi

Z
 Ildebrando Zacchini
 Giuseppe Zamboni
 Girolamo Zenti

 
Italian
Inventors
Inventors